Bernard Mayo (1921 – 14 February 2000) was an English philosopher. 
He worked at University of Birmingham until 1968, when he joined University of St. Andrews as professor of moral philosophy, from which he retired in 1983.
He was editor of Analysis (1956–65) and The Philosophical Quarterly (1973–80).

Books
Logic of personality (Jonathan Cape, 1952)
Ethics and the moral life (Macmillan Publishers and St. Martin's Press, 1958)
The philosophy of right and wrong (Routledge, 1986)

Publications
Rules' of Language, Philosophical Studies, vol. 2, pp. 1–11, 1951
Ethics and Moral Controversy, The Philosophical Quarterly, Vol. 4, No. 14 (Jan., 1954), pp. 1–14
Poetry, Language and Communication, Journal of Philosophy, Vol. 29, No. 109 (Apr., 1954), pp. 131–145
Events and Language, in Philosophy and Analysis by Margaret MacDonald, 1954
Professor J. J. C. Smart on temporal asymmetry, Australasian Journal of Philosophy, Volume 33, Issue 1 May 1955, pp 38–44
The Incongruity of Counterparts, Philosophy of Science, Vol. 25, No. 2 (Apr., 1958), pp. 109–115
Objects, Events, and Complementarity, The Philosophical Review, Vol. 70, No. 3, pp. 340–361, July 1961
The Open Future, Mind, vol. 71, 1962, pp. 1–14
A note on J. L. Austin's performative theory of knowledge, Philosophical Studies, vol. 14, no. 1–2, January, 1963
The Incoherence of Determinism, Journal of Philosophy, Vol. 44, No. 168 (Apr., 1969), pp. 89–100
On the Keith Lehrer-Richard Taylor Analysis of 'Can'-Statements, Mind, New Series, Vol. 77, No. 306 (Apr., 1968), pp. 271–278

References

20th-century English philosophers
Academics of the University of Birmingham
Academics of the University of St Andrews
1921 births
2000 deaths
Alumni of the University of Birmingham